

Egyptian Super League 

<noinclude>

Matches

Egypt Cup

Notes

References 

Basketball
Basketball teams established in 1907
Basketball teams in Egypt
Al Ahly SC seasons